Marletta is a surname. Notable people with the surname include:

 Giulia Marletta, Italian-born film producer, television producer, director, and entertainment executive
 Michael Marletta (born 1951), American biochemist

See also
 Marietta (disambiguation)